Ali Fergani (born September 21, 1952) is an Algerian football manager and former player who played in the midfield position as a playmaker.

Career
Fergani played club football for NA Hussein Dey and JE Tizi-Ouzou. Fergani played for the Algeria national football team at the 1980 Summer Olympics. He also took part in the 1982 FIFA World Cup in Spain.

In 1981, Fergani came third in a run for an African Footballer of the Year award.

Upon his retirement, Fergani was appointed as an assistant manager of Algeria national football team, as well as the coach of his former club JS Kabylie. His managing career took off to a good start as he won the 1990 African Cup of Nations in his homeland. Fergani was re-appointed as the coach of Algeria national team in 1995, but was dismissed just one year later, after a defeat to Kenya.

After leaving the national team, Fergani coached several Tunisian sides, including Club Athletic Bizertin, Union Sportive Monastir and Stade Tunisien, among others.

Following the resignation of Robert Waseige, Fergani was once again recalled to the Algeria national football team, as a manager.

On October 10, 2011, Fergani was appointed as manager of the Algeria A' national football team.

References

External links

1952 births
Living people
Sportspeople from Nord (French department)
Association football midfielders
Algerian footballers
Algeria international footballers
French footballers
French sportspeople of Algerian descent
1980 African Cup of Nations players
1982 African Cup of Nations players
1984 African Cup of Nations players
Algerian football managers
Algerian expatriate football managers
Olympic footballers of Algeria
Footballers at the 1980 Summer Olympics
1982 FIFA World Cup players
Mediterranean Games bronze medalists for Algeria
Competitors at the 1979 Mediterranean Games
Kabyle people
JS Kabylie players
NA Hussein Dey players
US Monastir (football) managers
Club Athlétique Bizertin managers
Espérance Sportive de Tunis managers
Algerian expatriate sportspeople in Tunisia
Expatriate football managers in Tunisia
Algeria national football team managers
JS Kabylie managers
MC Oran managers
USM Alger managers
Expatriate football managers in Morocco
Algerian expatriate sportspeople in Morocco
1996 African Cup of Nations managers
SCC Mohammédia managers
Mediterranean Games medalists in football
Footballers from Hauts-de-France